Gastrochaena is a genus of saltwater clams, marine bivalve molluscs in the family Gastrochaenidae. The type species of this genus is Gastrochaena cuneiformis.

Species
Species in the genus Gastrochaena include:
 Gastrochaena brevis G.B. Sowerby I, 1834
 Gastrochaena carteri Nielsen, 1986
 Gastrochaena cuneiformis Spengler, 1783
 Gastrochaena denticulata Deshayes, 1855
 Gastrochaena difficilis Deshayes, 1855
 Gastrochaena frondosa Cotton, 1934
 Gastrochaena humilis Deshayes, 1855
 Gastrochaena kanaka Dall, Bartsch & Rehder, 1938
 Gastrochaena macroschisma Deshayes, 1855
 Gastrochaena ovata Sowerby I, 1834
 Gastrochaena philippinensis Deshayes, 1855
 Gastrochaena spathulata Deshayes, 1855

References

 Vaught, K.C. (1989). A classification of the living Mollusca. American Malacologists: Melbourne, FL (USA). . XII, 195 pp
 Gofas, S.; Le Renard, J.; Bouchet, P. (2001). Mollusca, in: Costello, M.J. et al. (Ed.) (2001). European register of marine species: a check-list of the marine species in Europe and a bibliography of guides to their identification. Collection Patrimoines Naturels, 50: pp. 180–213
 Huber M. (2010) Compendium of bivalves. A full-color guide to 3,300 of the world’s marine bivalves. A status on Bivalvia after 250 years of research. Hackenheim: ConchBooks. 901 pp., 1 CD-ROM.
 

Gastrochaenidae
Bioluminescent molluscs
Bivalve genera